Enteromius mocoensis is a species of ray-finned fish in the genus Enteromius which is endemic to Angola where it occurs in the upper reaches of the Cuvo River and the Kwanza systems.

References 

 

Endemic fauna of Angola
Enteromius
Taxa named by Ethelwynn Trewavas
Fish described in 1936